Who Are We? may refer to:
Who Are We? The Challenges to America's National Identity, a 2004 treatise by American political scientist and historian Samuel P. Huntington (1927–2008);
Who are we?, one of the more typical questions about the meaning of life.
 Who Are We? (album)